Phillipa Love (born 8 April 1990) is a New Zealand rugby union player. She plays for the Black Ferns internationally and was a member of their 2021 Rugby World Cup champion squad. She also plays for Matatū in the Super Rugby Aupiki competition and represents Canterbury provincially.

Rugby career

2014–2016 
Love made her debut for New Zealand against Canada on 14 June 2014 at Whakatāne. She was overlooked altogether in 2015. She was recalled to the Black Ferns in 2016 for their Northern Hemisphere tour, but ruptured her ACL during training and was ruled out for six months.

2017 
In 2017, she earned her second cap against Canada, but was not named in the World Cup squad. She featured in the test match against the United States in 2018 at Chicago. Love was selected for the 2019 Women's Rugby Super Series at San Diego and played in every game. She played for the Black Ferns against a New Zealand Barbarians team in 2020 at Trafalgar Park in Nelson, New Zealand.

2021–2022 
Love was named in the Black Ferns squad for the European tour of England and France for 2021. She signed with Matatū for the inaugural Super Rugby Aupiki season in 2022.

Love was selected for the Black Ferns squad for the 2022 Pacific Four Series. In August, she made the team again for a two-test series against the Wallaroos for the Laurie O'Reilly Cup. She was selected for the Black Ferns 32-player squad for the 2021 Rugby World Cup.

References

External links 

 Black Ferns Profile

1990 births
Living people
New Zealand women's international rugby union players
New Zealand female rugby union players